Gbeho is a surname of Anlo Ewe origin. Notable people with this surname include:

Komla Dumor, Ghanaian journalist and broadcaster; his mother, Cecilia Dumor was from the Gbeho family, the daughter of Philip Gbeho and the sister of James Victor Gbeho
Philip Gbeho, Ghanaian musician, composer and teacher best known for his composition of the Ghana National Anthem
James Victor Gbeho, Ghanaian lawyer, politician and diplomat
Mawuena Trebarh, Ghanaian business executive, her mother, Cecilia Dumor was from the Gbeho family, the daughter of Philip Gbeho and the sister of James Victor Gbeho

Ghanaian families
Ghanaian surnames
Roman Catholic families
Ghanaian Roman Catholics
Ewe families
Ewe people
Gbeho family